Grafing bei München (officially: Grafing b.München) is a town in the district of Ebersberg, Upper Bavaria, Germany.

Geography
The distance is roughly the same to Rosenheim and Wasserburg am Inn.

The town has the following traditional rural land units (Gemarkungen in German): Elkofen, Grafing b.München, Nettelkofen, Oexing and Straußdorf.

Grafing station, which is to the west of the town, has access to the Munich S-Bahn network, as well as to Regional-Express and Regionalbahn trains of the national Deutsche Bahn railway company on the Munich–Salzburg railway line opened in 1870. Here the Filzenexpress line branches off to Wasserburg, served by SüdostBayernBahn trains.  There is also a station called Grafing Stadt in the town, which is served by the S-Bahn.

History
The town, founded about 960 as Gisling, belonged to the Munich  and the Swabian legal district in the Electorate of Bavaria. During the Thirty Years' War, Grafing was looted and set on fire by Swedish troops in 1632. Only the castle Elkofen, so the legend, was overlooked by Swedish troops.

In the course of administrative reform in the Bavarian kingdom, the Grafing municipality was established by the royal 1818 community edict. The neighbouring village of Oexing was incorporated into Grafing on 1 August 1933, after the two settlements had grown together over the decades. Several polls were held, until the citizens chose to assume the name Grafing. All that nowadays remains to recall the formerly two localities are the two parish churches, one in Grafing proper and the other one in former Oexing.

Grafing moreover was home to a market court with far-reaching judicial autonomy. In 1953 the united municipality received town privileges, and with regional reform in 1978, the former communities of Elkofen, Nettelkofen and Straußdorf were merged into it.

Population

1950:  6763 
1970:  9426 (+39.4%)
1987:  11039 (+17.1%)
2003:  12395 (+12.3%)
2004:  12493 (+0.8%)
2006:  12543 (+0.4%)
2009:  12761 (+1.7%)
2012:  12935 (+1.4%)
2014:  13368 (+3.3%)
2018:  13800 (+3.2%)

Politics
Since 2020 the mayor (Bürgermeister) is Christian Bauer  (CSU). Town council seats are apportioned thus: 
 CSU (9)
 Greens (7)
 Free Voters (3)
 SPD (2)
 Bavaria Party (1)
 FDP (1)
 The Left (1)

In 1999, the town's tax revenue, converted to euros, was €7,703,000, of which €1,654,000 was business taxes.

Coat of arms
Grafing's arms might heraldically be described thus: In Or a bear rampant sable armed and langued sable. The local lore has it that Emperor Ludwig the Bavarian granted the town these arms in 1325. The Grafingers had taken part in the great battle near Ampfing-Mühldorf between Kaiser Ludwig and Duke Friedrich the Handsome of Austria in 1322 with that little flag at the Emperor's side, and fought in this battle, it is said, “like bears”.

Education

Schools
Grundschule Grafing (elementary school)
Georg-Huber-Hauptschule
Gymnasium Grafing
Johann-Comenius-Schule (special pedagogical continuing education centre)
Gymnasium im Collegium Augustinum

Other educational institutions
Volkshochschule Grafing
Musikschule
Kreisbildungswerk (“District Education Works”)
Evangelisches Bildungswerk

Sightseeing
Rathaus (town hall)
Pfarrkirche St. Ägidius (parish church)
Marktkirche (church)
Leonhardikirche (church)
Wildbräugebäude (building)
Schloss Elkofen (castle)
Mariensäule (column)
Heimatmuseum im Rieperdinger-Haus (“Homeland Museum”)

Sport clubs

The best known Grafing sport club beyond the region is EHC Klostersee. It is named after the Klostersee (lake) lying in the neighbouring town of Ebersberg where the first ice hockey games were held in the 1950s. Early on the club moved to Grafing, although it kept its name. Games are nowadays played in a purpose built arena with a first class Italian Restaurant which overlooks the playing area

The club's claim to fame is that it is the first men's hockey team to play in the Federation-wide Oberliga (Third League).

The club has also won national titles in speed skating and shorttrack speed skating events. Local shorttracker Susanne Rudolph also competed in the Olympic Winter Games in Turin.

The sport club with the most members of any in town is TSV Grafing von 1864. As well as the football division with two men's, one women's and numerous youth teams, there are also many smaller divisions within the club. Especially successful among these are the men's volleyball team, which currently plays in the Second Bundesliga South, and the women's judo team, which has met with success in the Bavarian League.

Pictures

Twin towns

Grafing is twinned with:

  Saint-Marcellin, Isère, France, since 1993

Notable people
 Max Joseph Wagenbauer (1775-1829), landscape and animal painter / lithographer, royal court painter and gallery inspector
 Josef Schuster (1906-1996), German weightlifter

References

External links

 The town’s website
 Information from the travel club 
 Town of Grafing Museum

Ebersberg (district)